Phuong, or High Katu, is a Katuic language (Mon-Khmer) of Vietnam.

References

Further reading
 Sidwell, Paul. (2005). The Katuic languages: classification, reconstruction and comparative lexicon. LINCOM studies in Asian linguistics, 58. Muenchen: Lincom Europa. 

Katuic languages